The Southern States Wrestling (SSW) Junior Heavyweight Championship is a secondary professional wrestling championship in Southern States Wrestling. Eddie Golden was the inaugural champion, defeating Jamie Gibson in Banner Elk, North Carolina on March 30, 1992. The title is generally defended in the Southern United States, most often in its home base in East Tennessee, but also as far away as North Carolina. It was retired and revived twice before being renamed the Championship Wrestling Junior Heavyweight Championship in June 2004. There are 7 recognized known champions with a total of 10 title reigns.

Title history

References

External links
Official Tag Team Championship Title History

Regional professional wrestling championships